Cosentini is an Italian surname.

The roots of the name can be traced to Cosenza in the region of Calabria.

People
Notable people with the surname include:

Nicola Cosentini (born 1988), Italian footballer
William R. Cosentini (1911–1954), American mechanical engineer and businessman who founded Cosentini Associates
Adrian Cosentini, American mastering engineer

Companies
Cosentini Associates, mechanical engineering firm based in New York City

Other
Mazatlania cosentini, a species of sea snails

Italian-language surnames